Built in 1953, the Giant Heart exhibit, originally called the "Engine of Life" exhibit, is one of the most popular and notable exhibits at the Franklin Institute. The exhibit is roughly two stories tall and 35-feet in diameter. A walk-through exhibit, visitors can explore the different areas of the heart.

History 
The original idea for the walk-through heart exhibit came from Dr. Mildred Pfeiffer, a physician and Director of Cardiovascular Diseases at the Pennsylvania Department of Health who would travel giving lectures about the heart and heart health; she proposed the idea of the heart in an effort to have a centralized resource that people could visit and learn of the heart. The original materials used to construct the heart were papier-mâché, chicken wire and lumber.

The Giant Heart was supposed to have only been on display for six months, but now almost 70 years later, it remains one of the most visited exhibits at The Franklin Institute.

Renovation 
The Giant Heart and its accompanying Bio-science Exhibit, have since been remodeled and updated. The Bio-science exhibit as a whole carries on the tradition of teaching and sparking interest in the science of the human body.

References

External links 
 

Heart
Franklin Institute
Cardiac anatomy
Museums in Philadelphia